Walter Daniels Plays with Monsieur Jeffrey Evans & The Oblivians at Melissa's Garage is a 10" album by Memphis garage-rock band the Oblivians. The album was released in 1995 by Texas record label, Undone. The album features Austin-based harmonicist Walter Daniels and Memphis-based vocalist Jeffery Evans. In 1999, it was rereleased with additional tracks as Melissa's Garage Revisited.

Track listing
 It Don't Take Too Much - 3:53
 Rockin' In The Graveyard - 2:53 
 Don't Worry - 2:31 
 Dearest Darling - 3:46 
 We're Not in It to Lose - 1:58

Credits
 Greg Oblivian - Guitar, vocals, drums
 Jack Oblivian - Guitar, vocals, drums
 Eric Oblivian - Guitar, vocals, drums
 Monsieur Jeffrey Evans - Guitar, vocals
 Walter Daniels - Harmonica, vocals

Oblivians albums
1995 albums